Mu Ko Chang National Park is in Trat Province, eastern Thailand. It spans several provincial districts. It is a marine national park with an area of 406,250 rai ~ , including 52 islands. The most notable island within the archipelago is Ko Chang. The park is an IUCN Category II protected area with coral reefs.

Fauna
Jawed vertebrates present around the island include Oceanic whitetip shark and Whitetip reef shark. Among the reptile and amphibian species are King cobra, Reticulated python, Common water monitor, Hawksbill sea turtle and Soft-shelled turtle. Pink skunk clownfish is also around the island. Mammals on the island include Barking deer, Small Indian civet, Squirrel and Stump-tailed macaque. Bird population include Red-headed trogon, Tickell's blue flycatcher, Blue-winged pitta, Hooded pitta, Great hornbill, Wreathed hornbill, Oriental pied hornbill, Shikra, Green imperial pigeon and Heart-spotted woodpecker.

See also
List of national parks of Thailand
List of Protected Areas Regional Offices of Thailand

References

External links
 Mu Ko Chang National Park National Park information in English.
 Mu Ko Chang National Park National Park information from Dept of National Parks in Thai language.

National parks of Thailand
Protected areas established in 1982
IUCN Category II
Geography of Trat province
Tourist attractions in Trat province
1982 establishments in Thailand